Ronald G. Parys (October 7, 1938 – September 16, 2007) was an American politician who was a member of the Wisconsin State Assembly and the Wisconsin State Senate.

Biography
Parys was born on October 7, 1938, in Milwaukee, Wisconsin. He attended Messmer High School before graduating from Riverside University High School and served in the United States Army Reserve. Parys was survived by his wife Dawne and four adult children from an earlier marriage. On September 16, 2007, he died at his home in Englewood, Florida.

Political career
Parys served three terms in the Assembly before being elected to the Senate from the 9th district in a special election in 1969. He was a strong advocate for the people of his district, which included some of Milwaukee's poorest neighborhoods. He also supported legalized gambling in the form of a State Lottery and Bingo, arguing that profits from these venues could aid a financially struggling public school system. As history has proven, it was an idea before its time. He was a Democrat.

References

Politicians from Milwaukee
Democratic Party Wisconsin state senators
Democratic Party members of the Wisconsin State Assembly
Military personnel from Milwaukee
United States Army soldiers
1938 births
2007 deaths
American politicians of Polish descent
20th-century American politicians
People from Englewood, Florida